The Yunnan red-backed vole (Eothenomys miletus) is a species of rodent in the family Cricetidae. It is found in Southwest China, specifically Yunnan Province. It is the largest member of the genus Eothenomys, with a higher cranium, a soft, thick and long coat with tawny brown to reddish brown coloring and grey underparts.

References

Musser, G. G. and M. D. Carleton. 2005. Superfamily Muroidea. pp. 894–1531 in Mammal Species of the World a Taxonomic and Geographic Reference. D. E. Wilson and D. M. Reeder eds. Johns Hopkins University Press, Baltimore.

Eothenomys
Fauna of Yunnan
Mammals described in 1914
Taxa named by Oldfield Thomas